Tournament Park is a park and athletics venue in Pasadena, California, United States, northeast of Los Angeles. Currently maintained by the California Institute of Technology, it was simply known as the "town lot" before being renamed "Tournament Park"  Tournament Park gets its name from the Tournament of Roses, and it served as a venue in the early 20th century for events associated with the Tournament, such as chariot races, ostrich races, and even a race between a camel and an elephant.  Besides hosting Tournament of Roses events, the venue hosted other events at the turn of the 20th century, such as the Southern California Horse Show Association's annual horse show. Tournament Park is best known as the site of the first eight Rose Bowl Games

Background
Tournament Park hosted a handful of USC football games, chiefly against out-of-state opponents, in the 1910s and 1920s prior to the construction of Los Angeles Memorial Coliseum, since the park dwarfed USC's then on-campus venue of Bovard Field.

Following the departure of the New Year's Day game to the new stadium in 1923, the facility's capacity was reduced substantially, though the parade route ended at Tournament Park for a number of years following the Rose Bowl's completion.  Tournament Park, along with the Rose Bowl, served as the venue for Caltech's football team until the school dropped the program.

The stadium site, now known as South Athletic Field, is bounded by the Fox-Stanton Track (named after former Caltech football coach Fox Stanton), and continues to serve as Caltech's track and field venue.  The surrounding park, which continues under the Tournament Park moniker, contains a playground and picnic facility.

Bowl games at Tournament Park

See also
1902 Rose Bowl
1916 Rose Bowl
Tournament of Roses Parade

References

Parks in Los Angeles County, California
Sports venues in Los Angeles County, California
California Institute of Technology buildings and structures
College track and field venues in the United States
Geography of Pasadena, California
History of Pasadena, California
American football venues in California
Athletics (track and field) venues in California
Defunct college football venues
Defunct horse racing venues in California
Defunct NCAA bowl game venues
Rose Bowl Game
Tournament of Roses
USC Trojans football venues
1900 establishments in California